Lobosculum pustula is a species of small air-breathing land snail, a terrestrial gastropod mollusk in the family Polygyridae.

References

Polygyridae
Gastropods described in 1822